The National People's Congress Social Development Affairs Committee is one of ten special committees of the National People's Congress, the national legislature of the People's Republic of China. The special committee was created on March 13, 2018, which under the plan on deepening reform of Party and State Institutions.

Chairpersons

References

Social Development Affairs Committee
2018 establishments in China
Government agencies established in 2018